Alexandrovskoye is a rural locality (a selo) in Annenskoye Rural Settlement, Vytegorsky District, Vologda Oblast, Russia. The population was 22 as of 2002. There are 3 streets.

Geography 
Alexandrovskoye is located 52 km southeast of Vytegra (the district's administrative centre) by road. Pavshozero is the nearest rural locality.

References 

Rural localities in Vytegorsky District